Graham Easter (born 26 September 1969) is an English former professional footballer who played as a winger.

Career
Easter played in England for Huddersfield Town, Crewe Alexandra, Preston North End and Northwich Victoria, and in Denmark for Viborg FF. He became Assistant Coach  of FC Svendborg in 2009.

References

1969 births
Living people
English footballers
Huddersfield Town A.F.C. players
Crewe Alexandra F.C. players
Preston North End F.C. players
Northwich Victoria F.C. players
English Football League players
English expatriate footballers
Expatriate men's footballers in Denmark
Association football wingers
Viborg FF players
English expatriate sportspeople in Denmark
Danish Superliga players